Artyom Filiposyan (born 6 January 1988) is an Uzbek professional footballer of Armenian descent who plays as a centre-back.

Career

Club
He began his playing career at Mash'al Mubarek. After two seasons he moved to Nasaf Qarshi where he spent three seasons. In 2011, he became with Nasaf winner of AFC Cup and runners-up in Uzbek League and Uzbek Cup.

On 14 December 2011 Bunyodkor announced signing Filiposyan.

In February 2014, Filiposyan was signed by Chinese Super League side Liaoning Whowin. On 29 May 2014, he was released along with Billy Celeski. On 1 July 2014 he signed 6 months contract with Lokomotiv Tashkent.

International
He made debut for national team in 2009 as he called up by coach Mirjalol Qosimov into first team squad. He appeared in 2011 AFC Asian Cup by coach Vadim Abramov and he was one of main successful key players for Uzbekistan national football team by gaining 4th.

In 2014 WC qualifying, he with Ki Sung-Yueng of South Korea had been convicted both for scoring own goal. The match ended 2-2 in Tashkent.

Honours

Club
Nasaf
 Uzbek League runner-up (1): 2011
 Uzbek Cup runner-up (1): 2011
 AFC Cup winner: 2011

Bunyodkor
 Uzbek League (1): 2013
 Uzbek League runner-up (1): 2011
 Uzbek Cup  (2): 2012, 2013
 AFC Champions League semifinal: 2012

Lokomotiv
 Uzbek League runner-up (1): 2014
 Uzbek Cup  (1): 2014
PT Prachuap FC
 Thai League Cup (1) : 2019

Career statistics

References

External links

1988 births
Living people
Ethnic Armenian sportspeople
Uzbekistani footballers
Uzbekistani people of Armenian descent
FC Bunyodkor players
Liaoning F.C. players
Expatriate footballers in China
Uzbekistani expatriate sportspeople in China
Uzbekistani expatriate footballers
Chinese Super League players
People from Qashqadaryo Region
Association football defenders
AFC Cup winning players
Artyom Filiposyan